Etienne De Beule (born 20 November 1953) is a Belgian former professional racing cyclist. He rode in the 1985 Tour de France.

References

External links

1953 births
Living people
Belgian male cyclists
People from Hamme
Cyclists from East Flanders